Annette Stensson-Fjordefalk (born Stensson 23 December 1958 in Borås) is a Swedish actress.

Selected filmography
1991 - Sunes jul (TV)
1997 - Slutspel
2006 - LasseMajas detektivbyrå
2009 - A Midsummer Night’s Party

References

External links

Living people
People from Borås
1958 births
Swedish actresses